Przedbórz  is a town in Radomsko County, Łódź Voivodeship, Poland, with 3,458 inhabitants (2020). Przedbórz is situated on the Pilica River in the northwestern corner of the historic province of Lesser Poland. From its foundation until the Partitions of Poland, it belonged to Lesser Poland’s Sandomierz Voivodeship.

The origins of the name of the town are not known. There are two explanations - it either comes from its location przed borem - in front of the wilderness, because in the Middle Ages Przedbórz was surrounded by the vast forests of the Pilica Wilderness and Holy Mountains Wilderness; or from an ancient Slavic first name Przedbor, which was popular in the early Middle Ages (a person named Przedbor might have founded a settlement here).

Przedbórz (known in the past as Predbor, Predbrij, Pridborz, Przedborzs, Przedborze) is first mentioned in documents dating from 1145 as being under the jurisdiction of the Trzemeszno Monastery. King Kazimierz Wielki granted it the status of a city in 1370. He also built a castle, and frequently visited the town during his hunting trips. The Polish king Władysław Jagiełło also visited Przedbórz on several occasions. In 1512, Przedbórz had a school and a large brewery. In 1638, a fire destroyed the town and it was completely destroyed again by the Swedes in 1655 during the Deluge.

During the Partitions of Poland Przedbórz was a border town for a short period of time when the Austrian - Prussian border was established along the Pilica river in 1795. In 1807 Przedbórz was annexed by the Duchy of Warsaw which became Russian-controlled Congress Poland in 1815. In the 19th century Przedbórz emerged as a local center of industry. In 1823, a cloth factory was opened by Wojciech Lange and a town hall was built in 1838–1840. During the January Uprising a battle between the insurgents and the Russians took place here (June 27, 1863). In the Second Polish Republic, Przedbórz, as part of Końskie County was a part of the Kielce Voivodeship. On the other side of the Pilica river the suburban community of Widoma had 340 residents in 1862. In World War II the area of Przedbórz was a center of resistance where units of Major Henryk Dobrzański were active. On Feb. 10, 1944, the Home Army attacked Przedbórz, destroying several facilities.

A Jewish community is documented as being established in Przedbórz by 1570.  At the beginning of the Second World War, the town was 60% Jewish.  Before the Second World War, tourists would travel to Przedbórz to visit the architecturally notable Przedbórz Synagogue.

In January 1940, the Germans established a ghetto where they gathered 4,600 Jews. In 1942, the Germans liquidated the ghetto and all Jews were murdered at Treblinka extermination camp. After the war, in 1945, 9 Jews returned to Przedbórz, they were later attacked by antisemitic members of the NSZ; similar fates befell other Polish Jews in the post-war era. The Jews were tied and taken away in a lorry to a forest in Radoszyce, where they were shot.  It is not known if there were other survivors.

Przedbórz gives its name to the nearby protected area known as Przedbórz Landscape Park.

Points of Interest
 Church of Saint Alex (1278), rebuilt in 1341 and 1659.
 Tenement houses from the 18th and 19th centuries.
 Ruins of a 14th-century castle, which was burned in 1655, and abandoned in 1765.

Notable People
 Rabbi Moshe Biderman of Lelov (1776-1851), Rabbi of Przedbórz from 1843 until 1850

References

External links 
Information at www.jewishgen.org
An old map
Site about Przedbórz. History, photo gallery, Przedbórz Landscape Park, Przedbórz Folk Museum, interesting places in Przedbórz
Przedbórz website

Cities and towns in Łódź Voivodeship
Radomsko County
Shtetls
Holocaust locations in Poland